Progress 32 was a Soviet uncrewed Progress cargo spacecraft, which was launched in September 1987 to resupply the Mir space station.

Launch
Progress 32 launched on 23 September 1987 from the Baikonur Cosmodrome in the Kazakh SSR. It used a Soyuz-U2 rocket.

Docking
Progress 32 docked with the aft port of the Kvant-1 module of Mir on 26 September 1987 at 01:08:15 UTC, and was undocked on 10 November 1987 at 04:09:10 UTC. The vehicle was redocked at 05:47:25 UTC the same day and finally undocked on 17 November 1987 at 19:24:37 UTC.

Decay
It remained in orbit until 19 November 1987, when it was deorbited. The deorbit burn occurred at 00:10:00 UTC and the mission ended at 00:58 UTC.

See also

 1987 in spaceflight
 List of Progress missions
 List of uncrewed spaceflights to Mir

References

Progress (spacecraft) missions
1987 in the Soviet Union
Spacecraft launched in 1987
Spacecraft which reentered in 1987
Spacecraft launched by Soyuz-U rockets